Superstretch and Microwoman are a fictional, shape-shifting, husband and wife crime-fighting team, shown as a segment of Tarzan and the Super 7 television series 1978-1980).

Fictional biography

On the surface Chris and Christy Cross were just your average suburban couple. But when they sprang into action, Chris could take virtually any shape (such as a plane, a robot, a rubber ball, a perfect double of a villain, etc.).

Christy could, as her name implied, shrink to microscopic size. Frequently tagging along on their adventures was their little dog, Trouble. The duo was a new concept for superhero cartoons in that they were the first African-American man/woman duo, and that they did not change into superhero costumes when the need to use their powers came, or adopt a "secret identity", simply wearing ordinary clothes. They were generally seen in lightweight adventures that were resolved simply, although a few episodes had them dealing with major crimes or a supernatural evil. Some times if the need arose, Christy and Chris would use their powers not to fight crime, but to accomplish household chores.

First appearance
 Superstretch and Microwoman - a segment of Tarzan and the Super 7 (Filmation for CBS, September 9, 1978)

Episodes
 "Bad Things Come in Small Packages" 
 "The Ringmaster" 
 "The Toymaker" 
 "Future Tense" 
 "Phantom of the Sewers" 
 "Shadow on the Swamp" 
 "The Great Candy Bar Caper" 
 "The Superstretch Bowl" 
 "Superstarch and Magnawoman" 
 "Sugar Spice" 
 "Gnome Man's Land"

Voices
Chris/Superstretch voiced by Ty Henderson
Christy/Microwoman voiced by Kim Hamilton
Lt. Buzz Tucker voiced by Howard Morris

References

External links

 The Big Cartoon Database

Black characters in animation
Fictional African-American people
Fictional characters who can stretch themselves
Fictional shapeshifters
Fictional married couples
Superhero duos
Fictional characters who can change size
Television series segments